The National Black Catholic Clergy Caucus (NBCCC) is an organization of African-American clergy, religious, and seminarians within the Catholic Church.

History 
The group was founded in April 1968, shortly after the assassination of Martin Luther King Jr. The murder of King sparked a radical activist notion among Black Catholic clergy, who had themselves been mistreated for some time within the Catholic Church—after being locked out from the priesthood altogether for much of US Church history.

The new group was convened in Detroit by Fr Herman A. Porter, who sent out a call to Black Catholic clergy nationwide. A religious brother, a religious sister (Sr. Martin De Porres Grey, RSM), and a White clergyman also attempted to attend, but were eventually rebuffed. (Grey went on to found the National Black Sisters Conference shortly thereafter.)

The group discussed the situation before them, and formulated a statement that, after being published, made waves within the Church, largely due to its opening line:The Catholic Church in the United States, primarily a white racist institution, has addressed itself primarily to white society and is definitely a part of that society. On the contrary, we feel that her primary, though not exclusive work, should be in the area of institutional, attitudinal and societal change.The statement also made a number of demands of the largely White hierarchy, most of which went unanswered.

The group has continued to meet annually since, including in a joint conference with the NBSC and the National Black Seminarians' Association (NBCSA), a constituent organization of the NBCCC.

In 2020, the NBCCC teamed with the NBSC, National Association of Black Catholic Administrators, and the Institute for Black Catholic Studies to make a statement in support of the Black Lives Matter movement.

Joseph Davis Award 
Each year during the Black Catholic Joint Conference with Black sisters, seminarians, deacons and their wives, the NBCCC bestows the Fr Joseph M. Davis Award for lifetime achievement, so named in honor of the NBCCC's first executive director.

Awardees have included:

 Br Booker Ashe, OFM Cap.
 Fr Joseph Brown, SJ
 Bishop Dominic Carmon, SVD
 Fr George H. Clements
 Fr Chris Coleman
 Dcn Dunn Cumby
 Fr Cyprian Davis, OSB
 Br Joseph Davis, SM
 Bishop Joseph Francis, SVD
 Br Loyola Freightman, OFM
 Fr Jim Goode, OFM
 Fr Boniface Hardin, OSB
 Archbishop James P. Lyke, OFM
 Fr Al McKnight, CsSp
 Dcn Arthur "Art" Miller
 Fr William Norvel, SSJ
 Fr Herman Porter, SCJ
 Fr Thaddeus J. Posey, OFM Cap.
 Dcn Paul Richardson
 Fr Clarence Rivers
 Fr Cyprian Rowe
 Msgr Leonard Scott
 Fr Charles Smith, SVD
 Fr Chester Smith, SVD
 Br Roy Smith, CSC
 Fr Benedict M Taylor, OFM
 Fr Wilbur Thomas
 Fr August L. Thompson
 Dcn Marvin Threatt
 Dcn Thomas White

See also
The National Office for Black Catholics

References

External links
 National Black Catholic Clergy Caucus - official website

African-American Roman Catholicism
Catholic Church in the United States
Catholic organizations